Tylor J. Megill (born July 28, 1995) is an American professional baseball pitcher for the New York Mets of Major League Baseball (MLB). He made his MLB debut in 2021. He pitched five innings of a combined no-hitter in April 2022. His nickname is Big Drip.

Early life 
Megill was born on July 28, 1995, in Long Beach, California, to Julie and Kevin Megill. He attended Los Alamitos High School where he was a pitcher on their baseball team.

College career 
Undrafted in the 2014 Major League Baseball draft, he enrolled at Loyola Marymount University where he played college baseball. In 2015, his freshman year, he pitched 57 innings, going 6–3 with a 3.95 ERA. After that season, he transferred to Cypress College where he spent 2016, and went 11–3 with a 3.72 ERA over 17 games (16 starts). Following the season, he transferred once again, this time to the University of Arizona. In 2017, his junior year, he pitched to a 2–3 record and a 5.55 ERA over  innings, mainly in relief. As a senior in 2018, he went 1–3 with a 4.73 ERA over  innings, striking out 38 and collecting six saves. After the season, he was selected by the New York Mets in the eighth round of the 2018 Major League Baseball draft.

Professional career
Megill signed with the Mets and made his professional debut with the Brooklyn Cyclones, going 1–2 with a 3.21 ERA over 28 relief innings. In 2019, he began the season with the Columbia Fireflies and earned promotions to the St. Lucie Mets and the Binghamton Rumble Ponies during the year. Over 22 games (11 starts) between the three clubs, Megill went 6–7 with a 3.52 ERA, striking out 92 batters over  innings. Megill did not play in a game in 2020 due to the cancellation of the minor league season because of the COVID-19 pandemic. Megill returned to Binghamton, now members of the Double-A Northeast League, to begin 2021. After pitching to a 3.12 ERA over 26 innings with Binghamton, he was promoted to the Syracuse Mets of the Triple-A East League on June 1.

On June 23, 2021, Megill was selected to the 40-man roster and promoted to the major leagues for the first time. He made his first major league start against the Atlanta Braves that day and pitched 4⅓ innings, giving up three hits and two earned runs (one home run allowed) with two walks and four strikeouts on 92 pitches. He earned a no-decision as the Mets won the game by a score of 7–3. On July 23, Megill earned his first major league win after pitching six shutout innings against the Toronto Blue Jays. In the game, he also collected his first career hit, a single off of Blue Jays starter Steven Matz. Megill started a total of 18 games for the Mets, pitching to a 4–6 record, a 4.52 ERA, and 99 strikeouts over  innings.

At the start of the 2022 season, Megill was named the team's Opening Day starter due to injuries to Jacob deGrom and Max Scherzer. He was described in the New York Post as "maybe the most unlikely" Opening Day starter in Mets history. On April 29, 2022, Megill threw the first five innings of a combined no-hitter against the Philadelphia Phillies. On May 15, he was placed on the injured list with right biceps inflammation. Megill returned from the injured list in September as a relief pitcher and struggled in his appearances out of the bullpen. He was placed on the COVID-19 injured list shortly before the final game of the regular season and two days before the start of the team's playoff series against the San Diego Padres.

Personal life
Megill's older brother, Trevor, is also a pitcher in Major League Baseball.

References

External links 

1995 births
Living people
Baseball players from Long Beach, California
Major League Baseball pitchers
New York Mets players
Loyola Marymount Lions baseball players
Cypress Chargers baseball players
Arizona Wildcats baseball players
Brooklyn Cyclones players
Columbia Fireflies players
St. Lucie Mets players
Binghamton Rumble Ponies players
Syracuse Mets players